Clint Baker (born January 27, 1971, in Mountain View, California) is an American traditional jazz musician performing on cornet, trumpet, trombone, clarinet, saxophone, guitar, banjo, tuba, string bass, and drums.

Career
Clint produced his first record in 1991: “Clint Baker’s New Orleans Jazz Band Featuring Jim Klippert”. Since then, he has produced 8 recordings including: "In The Groove" (1992), "Going Huge" (1998),  "Tears" (2002), and “Who’s Foolin’ Who?” (2008).

Clint Baker’s New Orleans Jazz Band appeared at the New Orleans Jazz and Heritage Festival in 1992 and at the Monterey Jazz Festival in 1999. The band toured festivals in the US and Canada extensively and was voted one of the top five Favorite New (Emerging) Jazz Bands in the 1998 Mississippi Rag Trad Jazz and Ragtime Poll. (In the same poll Baker was voted one of the top three Favorite New (Emerging) Musicians.)

Selected discography
 In the Groove - Clint Baker's New Orleans Jazz Band - Burgundy Street
 Sugar Blues - Chris Tyle's Silver Leaf Jazz Band - Stomp Off
 In the Gutter - International Jazz Band - Jazz Crusade
 Ninety and Still Delivering - Narvin Kimball - DanSun
 Chasin' the Blues - Jim Cullum Jazz Band - Riverwalk
 Yama Yama Man - The Yerba Buena Stompers - Stomp Off
 Bohemian Maestro - The Hot Club of San Francisco - Azica
 Whatever Works (Official Motion Picture Soundtrack) - Tom Sharpsteen And His Orlandos - Razor & Tie

References

External links
 Clint Baker’s Official Website
 Cafe Borrone All-Stars Website
 Gerard Bielderman's Jazz Discographies
 Riverwalk Jazz Website 
 Mississippi Rag Website
 "In A Louis Mood: Clint Baker and Friends" 
 http://inmenlo.com/2010/07/08/clint-bakers-cafe-borrone-all-stars-bringing-new-orleans-jazz-to-menlo-park/

1971 births
American jazz musicians
Living people
Razor & Tie artists
Stomp Off artists